Stadtwerke München GmbH (Munich City Utilities) or SWM is a German communal company, owned by the city of Munich, which offers public services for the city and the region of Munich. The company supplies electricity for more than 95% of Munich's 750.000 households as well as natural gas, drinking water and, through its stake in the M-net Telekommunikations GmbH, telecommunications services. SWM is Europe's largest municipal utility company and ranks among Germany's principal energy providers according to company information. Expanding use of renewable energy has been a central element in the company's strategy since 2008. However, the company is also engaged in the industrialisation of the Norwegian wilderness through massive wind-turbines, which has created great opposition in Norway, among others in Sørmarka, Trøndelag.
Through its subsidiary, the Münchner Verkehrsgesellschaft mbH (MVG) (founded in 2001), the SWM also runs most of the inner city public transportation network by maintaining the Munich U-Bahn as well as the Munich Tramway and bus services.

Products

Electricity
Under the "M-Strom" name, SWM offers various electricity rates and related services for private and business customers in Munich and the surrounding region. Many offers are available nationwide. With more than 250,000 green energy customers, SWM refers to itself as one of the largest providers of green electricity in the private and commercial market in Germany. Within Munich city limits and the surrounding region, SWM operates twelve hydroelectric power plants, several plants which generate electricity from renewable energy, and the three cogeneration power plants Nord, Süd and Freimann, which generate around 70 percent of the electricity through cogeneration.

Natural gas
SWM supplies its customers with natural gas as part of the trans-European network. The company is also able to draw on its own underground storage. SWM offers various natural gas rates, some of which are available nationwide. In Munich, SWM operates ten natural gas stations where cars can fill up on renewable bio-methane.

District heating
When generating electricity in the cogeneration process, heat is created which is then inputted into the district heating grid from SWM's cogeneration plants. SWM produces district heating in its cogeneration and heating plants which supplies large buildings and households via over 800 kilometers of steam and hot water networks, which is then in turn used for heating and the supply of hot water. Thanks to wide-ranging investments in this area, connecting to the SWM district heating network is now possible in an increasing number of districts in Munich. By 2040, the aim is to produce 100 percent of district heating in Munich using renewable energies.<ref

District cooling
Compared to conventional air conditioning systems, district cooling has less of an environmental impact and is more energy efficient – in fact, district cooling requires around half of the primary energy required by air conditioning. Cold ground water is used as the energy source for cooling within a closed loop system, and only the pumps are operated using electricity. The slightly warmed groundwater is then subsequently returned to the groundwater system.

Water
Some 80 percent of the drinking water for Munich comes from the Mangfalltal valley near Weyarn in Upper Bavaria, while 20 percent is sourced from the Loisachtal valley near Garmisch-Partenkirchen, between Oberau and Farchant. The southern area of the Munich gravel plain also serves as a reserve for peaks in demand. The high quality of the city's drinking water is, among other things, attributable to these procurement areas in the Bavarian Alpine foothills, as well as the sustainable forestry in these regions.

Swimming pools
SWM operates ten indoor and eight outdoor swimming pools in Munich. The company's operations in this area deliver on the “Munich swimming pool concept” adopted by the city council in 1991, which provided for the improvement of the city's swimming pools for leisure and recreation. In Munich, there are two combined pool complexes (combination of indoor and outdoor pools): the Westbad in Weinbergerstrasse in the west and the Michaelibad in Heinrich-Wieland-Strasse in the east. The Michaelibad is Munich's largest recreation and leisure pool complex.

Energy advice
The offer range also includes the energy saving advice project for low-income households, which SWM carries out together with Munich-based charities.

Renewable energies project 
In 2008, SWM initiated an offensive for expanding the use of renewable energies. By 2025, SWM is aiming to produce as much green electricity with its own plants as consumed by the whole of Munich – some 7.5 billion kilowatt hours per year. The renewable energies expansion offensive has a budget of around nine billion euros. Currently, SWM holds a stake in the offshore wind parks Global Tech I, Gwynt y Môr and DanTysk, among others. Further projects like the offshore wind park Sandbank are currently in the planning phase.

Public transport 
Münchner Verkehrsgesellschaft mbH (MVG), a subsidiary of SWM, offers a range of public transport in Munich, including subway, bus and tram.

Telecommunications 
Together with its subsidiary M-net Telekommunikations GmbH, SWM is laying a fiber-optic network in Munich. Moreover, M-net is investing in the expansion of fiber-optic broadband networks in other regions of Bavaria. These are already available in over 50 percent of Bavarian households as well as for private and business customers in the Greater Ulm region.

Group structure 
Stadtwerke München has been a GmbH since 1998, i.e. a private law-governed limited company, which is wholly owned by the City of Munich. As a municipal company, SWM provides public services. SWM's headquarters is in the north of Munich, in Emmy-Noether-Strasse 2.

SWM has expanded its core business areas through participations.

Subsidiaries
SWM consists of the following subsidiaries:

 SWM Versorgungs GmbH
 SWM Infrastruktur GmbH
 SWM Infrastruktur Region GmbH
 SWM Services GmbH
 SWM Kundenservice GmbH, München
 Münchner Verkehrsgesellschaft mbH (MVG)

Investments
SWM has investments with the following companies:

 M-net Telekommunikations GmbH
 HKW Nord Beteiligungsgesellschaft mbH München
 Solardach München-Riem GmbH, München
 Kom-Strom AG, Leipzig
 KEA Bayern GmbH ("Kommunale Energie Allianz Bayern")
 aquaKomm GmbH & Co KG
 Erdgas Südbayern GmbH (ESB), München
 Gasversorgung Haar GmbH (GVH, Haar)
 Bayerngas GmbH, München
 Münchner U-Bahn-Bewachungsgesellschaft mbH (MUG), München
 P + R GmbH, München
 MGIS Gesellschaft für Consulting und innovative Software mbH
 Wirtschaftliche Vereinigung deutscher Versorgungsunternehmen AG (WV Energie AG), Frankfurt am Main
 Isar Nuclear Power Plant 2
 Portal München Betriebs-GmbH & Co. KG
 Andasol 3

Company management
The company's Chief Executive Officer is Dr. Florian Bieberbach. Other directors include Werner Albrecht (Personnel and Social Affairs), Ingo Wortmann (Public Transport) and Helge-Uve Braun (Technology). Dieter Reiter, Mayor of Munich, is Chairman of the Supervisory Board.

Power generation facilities in Munich and surrounding region 
In Munich and the surrounding area, SWM produces energy at around 50 plants.

Heating and cogeneration plants
 Westbad block-type cogeneration plant, operating since 1997
 Freimann cogeneration plant, operating since 1974 
 Nord cogeneration plant, operating since 1964
 Süd cogeneration plant, operating since 1899 for electricity generation, and since 1969 for district heating
 Gaisbergstrasse district heating plant, operating since 1974
 Kathi-Kobus-Strasse district heating plant, operating since 1965
 Koppstrasse district heating plant, operating since 1967
 Perlach district heating plant, operating since 1980
 Theresienstrasse district heating plant, operating since 1963

Hydroelectric plants
 Isarwerk 1: This run-of-the-river plant built on the Isar Works Canal in Munich has been in operation since 1908. The plant has been under monument protection since 1993. 
 Isarwerk 2: This run-of-the-river plant built on the Isar Works Canal in Munich has been in operation since 1923.
 Isarwerk 3: The run-of-the-river plant built on the Isar Works Canal in Munich has been in operation since 1923.
 Leitzachwerk 1: This power plant located in the Mangfalltal valley in Rosenheim district has been operating since 1983. 
 Leitzachwerk 2: This power plant located in the Mangfalltal valley in Rosenheim district has been operating since 1965.
 Leitzachwerk 3: This power plant located in the Mangfalltal valley in Rosenheim district has been operating since 1983.
 Maxwerk: This run-of-the-river power plant located in Munich's Auer Mühlbach is the oldest hydroelectric plant operated by SWM. It was built in 1895.
 Praterkraftwerk: This plant is invisible on the bed of the river in Munich's Isar, level with the Praterinsel. The plant has been operating since 2010. It is one of the small hydroelectric plants in Europe.
 Stadtbachstufe: This small hydroelectric power plant has been operating since 2006.
 Uppenbornwerk 1: This plant, which is located on the Middle Isar Canal near Moosburg, has been operating since 1930.
 Uppenbornwerk 2: The plant, which is located on the Middle Isar Canal near Moosburg, has been operating since 1951.
 Small hydroelectric power plant on the Sempt: The plant based in Wang has been operating since 2011.
 Hammer small hydroelectric power plant: The plant, which is located near Fischbachau, has been operating since 1976.

Photovoltaic plants
SWM currently operates 24 PV sites within Munich city limits and Moosburg. A total of 16 of the sites were actively financed by the income from the SWM M-Ökostrom green energy tariff. In this green energy rate, customers pay an extra surcharge compared to the standard SWM electricity rate. The income from the additional charge is used by SWM to build renewable energy plants in the region around Munich.

Others: Geothermal, wind, biogas
 Michaelibad biogas cogeneration plant, operating since 2013
 Riem geothermal plant: This plant has been operating since 2004 and provides the trade fair town of Riem with district heating.
 Geothermal cogeneration plant Sauerlach: This plant has been operating since 2014, and generates heating and electricity. 
 Fröttmaning wind plant, operating since 1999

SWM Education Foundation
SWM founded the SWM Education Foundation in November 2007. It promotes measures and projects in pre-school and school fields as well as in initial vocational training. To mark its fifth anniversary in 2013, the SWM Education Foundation introduced two new focuses to its work: its own scholarship program as well as an award. The scholarship program is aimed at students studying engineering as well as natural sciences, economic sciences and IT based in Munich and the surrounding region. The Foundation's award, which comes with 10,000 euros in prize money, has been presented every year since 2013 in recognition of special efforts in the field of education for disadvantaged children, teens and young adults.

Stadtwerke Project
Socially disadvantaged and/or individually affected young people are supported by SWM via the "Stadtwerke Project" education initiative. The Stadtwerke Project has worked together with the city's youth welfare office for over 25 years to offer around five young people per year a technical/commercial vocational training at SWM, in connection with career-related advice and socio-educational support. The young people not only receive a complete vocational training, but also support in leading an independent life.

Sports funding
SWM funds the sports teams Schwimmstartgemeinschaft Stadtwerke München (SG SWM, swimming team) and Leichtathletikgemeinschaft Stadtwerke München (LG SWM, track and field team). SG SWM was formed when the individual swimming clubs Isarnixen Damen-Schwimm-Verein München, Männer-Schwimm-Verein München, Freier Wassersportverein München and Schwimmverein München 1899 merged. The training and competitive sports club is successful in the fields of swimming, synchronized swimming, water polo and diving. Through its funding, the company aims to promote competitive sports in these four areas as well as participation in national and international competitions.

References

Additional sources
  Hutter, Dominik (May 17, 2011). "Natural Gas is Becoming More Expensive by Six Percent." Süddeutsche Zeitung.
  Näger, Doris (May 18, 2010). "Service Desert SWM." Süddeutsche Zeitung.

External links
Official homepage

Public services of Germany
Companies based in Munich
Transport in Munich
Government-owned companies of Germany